Bette Howland (January 28, 1937 – December 13, 2017) was an American writer and literary critic. She wrote for Commentary Magazine.

Personal life
Born Bette Lee Sotonoff to Sam Sotonoff, a machinist, and Jessie Berger, a homemaker, she focused much of her work on her native Chicago, though she left the city in 1975.

In 1956, she married Howard Howland, a  biologist. The couple had two sons but later separated and divorced, though she kept his surname. She worked as a librarian and did editorial work for the University of Chicago Press.

Critical reappraisal
In 2013 editor Brigid Hughes found Howland's book W-3 and decided to include some of Howland's work in an issue of the literary journal A Public Space dedicated to obscure and forgotten women writers.

A Public Space eventually decided to publish some of Howland's stories through their imprint in 2019, under the title Calm Sea and Prosperous Voyage.

Awards
 1984: MacArthur Fellows Program
 1978: Guggenheim Fellow

Works
The iron year, University of Iowa, 1967
W-3, Viking Press, 1974; 
Blue in Chicago, Harper & Row, 1978; 
Things to Come and Go: Three Stories, Knopf, 1983; 
Calm Sea and Prosperous Voyage, Brooklyn, NY : A Public Space Books, 2019, ISBN 978-0-9982675-0-0

Death
Howland died on December 13, 2017, in Tulsa, Oklahoma, aged 80. She had multiple sclerosis and dementia. She was survived by her two sons, Jacob and Frank; a sister, Mrs. Rochelle Altman; five grandchildren; and a great-granddaughter.

References

1937 births
2017 deaths
Jewish American writers
American women short story writers
American short story writers
Deaths from dementia in Oklahoma
Deaths from multiple sclerosis
MacArthur Fellows
21st-century American Jews
21st-century American women